Mount Cardrona in Central Otago, New Zealand is 1,936 metres (6,352 feet) high, and is most easily accessed from the Cardrona Ski Field. Mount Cardrona is in the Crown Range between Wānaka and Queenstown. The often photographed and historic Cardrona Hotel is located at the bottom of the access road that leads up to the Cardrona ski field.

References

Mountains of Otago